Ideal College Senior High School is a coeducational second-cycle private institution in the Greater Accra Region of Ghana.

Campuses
There are two campuses, one at Tema and the other at Legon.

Notable alumni
Caroline Esinam Adzogble, educationist, education entrepreneur and philanthropist

See also

 Education in Ghana
 List of senior high schools in Ghana
 List of Seventh-day Adventist secondary schools

References

Educational institutions with year of establishment missing
Christian schools in Ghana
High schools in Ghana
Private schools in Africa
Secondary schools affiliated with the Seventh-day Adventist Church
Tema